The Unitarian Universalist Meeting House of Provincetown is an historic church at 236 Commercial Street in Provincetown, Massachusetts.  The Greek Revival building was built in 1847 based on a design by Benjamin Hallett, for a congregation that had been established in 1829.  It is a massive post and beam timber-frame construction, and was originally built without the tower.  The tower, which is telescopic in form, with Greek ornamentation, is the only surviving steeple in Provincetown, and is a landmark for seafarers.

The church was listed on the National Register of Historic Places in 1972, and included in the Provincetown Historic District in 1989.  It is now called the Unitarian Universalist Meeting House.

See also
National Register of Historic Places listings in Barnstable County, Massachusetts

References

1829 establishments in Massachusetts
19th-century Unitarian Universalist church buildings
Churches completed in 1847
Churches in Barnstable County, Massachusetts
Churches on the National Register of Historic Places in Massachusetts
Greek Revival church buildings in Massachusetts
Historic district contributing properties in Cape Cod
National Register of Historic Places in Barnstable County, Massachusetts
Provincetown, Massachusetts
Unitarian Universalist churches in Massachusetts
Universalist Church of America churches